Ireland competed at the 2019 World Aquatics Championships in Gwangju, South Korea from 12 to 28 July.

Diving

Ireland entered three divers.

Men

Women

Mixed

Swimming

Ireland entered 10 swimmers.

Men

Women

Mixed

References

Nations at the 2019 World Aquatics Championships
Ireland at the World Aquatics Championships
2019 in Irish sport